Boluk (also Romanized as Bolūk and Bolook; also known as Bilūk and Bolūk-e Pā‘īn) is a city in Esmaili District, Jiroft County, Kerman Province, Iran. At the 2006 census, its population was 1,792, in 412 families.

References 

Populated places in Jiroft County